Ytterbium(III) nitrate is an inorganic compound, a salt of ytterbium and nitric acid with the chemical formula Yb(NO3)3. The compound forms colorless crystals, dissolves in water, and also forms crystalline hydrates.

Synthesis
Reaction of ytterbium and nitric oxide in ethyl acetate:

Reaction of ytterbium hydroxide and nitric acid:

Physical properties
Ytterbium(III) nitrate forms colorless hygroscopic crystals.

Soluble in water and ethanol.

Forms crystalline hydrates of the composition Yb(NO3)3*nH2O, where n = 4, 5, 6.

Chemical properties 
The hydrated ytterbium nitrate thermally decomposes to form YbONO3 and decomposes to ytterbium oxide upon further heating.

Application
Ytterbium(III) nitrate hydrate is used for nanoscale coatings of carbon composites.

Also used to obtain metallic ytterbium and as a chemical reagent.

Used as a component for the production of ceramics and glass.

References

Ytterbium compounds
Nitrates